was a Japanese writer of short stories and novels.

Biography
Born in Fukuoka, Kyushu, Umezaki studied at the 5th High School of Kumamoto University, later at the Tokyo Imperial University where he majored in Japanese literature. He then worked at the same Tokyo University in the Faculty of Education Sciences (kyōiku). In 1944, he was drafted as a crypto specialist for the Imperial Japanese Navy and stationed in Kagoshima Prefecture, Kyushu, an experience which he later dramatised in his famous novella Sakurajima, published in 1946. He came back on this experience in his latest book, Genka (Illusions) published in 1965, the year of his death.

After the war, he worked for the Sunao (素直) magazine, led by poet and social activist Shin'ichi Eguchi (1914–1979), in which Sakurajima and some of his short stories were published. Sakurajima established Umezaki as a representative of Japanese postwar literature along writers like Hiroshi Noma and Rinzō Shiina. The war theme later gave way to satirical stories like Boroya no shunjū, and still later to the examination of human anxiety in modern society.

Umezaki died of liver cirrhosis in Tokyo on 19 July 1965.

Selected works
 Fūen (風宴), 1939.
 Sakurajima (桜島), 1946.
 Hi no hate (日の果て, End of the Sun), 1947.
 Kuroi hana (黒い花, Black Flower), 1950.
 Nise no kisetsu (Season of forgery), 1954.
 Boroya no shunjū (ボロ家の春秋, Shanty Life or Occurrences of an Old Dilapidated House), 1954.
 Suna dokei (砂時計, The Hourglass), 1955.
 Tsumujikaze (つむじ風), 1957.
 Kurui-dako (狂ひ凧), 1963.
 Genka (幻化, Illusions), 1965.

Awards
 1954: Naoki Prize for Boroya no shunjū
 1955: Shinchō Award for Suna dokei
 1963: Ministry of Education, Culture, Sports, Science and Technology Award for Kurui-dako
 1965: Mainichi Publishing Culture Award for Genka (posthumously)

Adaptations
Films
 1954: Hi no hate, directed by Satsuo Yamamoto
 1963: Tsumujikaze, directed by Noboru Nakamura

References

Further reading
 Kumamoto University Prominent Alumni – Haruo Umezaki : http://ewww.kumamoto-u.ac.jp/dept/fifth/alumni/
 Erik R. Lofgren: Democratizing Illnesses: Umezaki Haruo, Censorship, and Subversion. In: Comparative Literature. 52, no 2, 2000, p. 157–178
 Scott J. Miller: Historical Dictionary of Modern Japanese Literature and Theater. In: Historical Dictionaries of Literature and the arts. Bd. 33, Scarecrow Press, Maryland 2009
 Kyle Grossman, Pomona College: Authors and Soldiers: Reconstructing History in Postwar Japan, 2012. At Claremont.edu.

20th-century Japanese male writers
20th-century Japanese novelists
1915 births
1965 deaths
University of Tokyo alumni
Naoki Prize winners
Imperial Japanese Navy personnel of World War II